Sound Beach, established in 1929, is a hamlet and census-designated place (CDP) in the north part of the Town of Brookhaven in Suffolk County, New York, United States. The population of the CDP was 7,612 at the 2010 census.

Geography
Sound Beach is located at  (40.956986, -72.970765). It is bordered on the north by Long Island Sound, by Rocky Point to the east, and Miller Place to the west.

Demographics

Demographics of the CDP
As of the census of 2000, there were 9,807 people, 3,358 households, and 2,612 families residing in the CDP. The population density was 3,691.1 per square mile (1,423.5/km2). There were 3,640 housing units at an average density of 1,370.0/sq mi (528.4/km2). The racial makeup of the CDP was 96.22% White, 0.63% African American, 0.14% Native American, 1.19% Asian, 0.07% Pacific Islander, 0.69% from other races, and 1.05% from two or more races. Hispanic or Latino of any race were 3.48% of the population.

There were 3,358 households, out of which 42.0% had children under the age of 18 living with them, 62.0% were married couples living together, 11.4% had a female householder with no husband present, and 22.2% were non-families. 16.7% of all households were made up of individuals, and 5.2% had someone living alone who was 65 years of age or older. The average household size was 2.91 and the average family size was 3.29.

In the CDP, the population was spread out, with 28.7% under the age of 18, 7.7% from 18 to 24, 33.7% from 25 to 44, 21.7% from 45 to 64, and 8.2% who were 65 years of age or older. The median age was 34 years. For every 100 females, there were 97.8 males. For every 100 females age 18 and over, there were 93.7 males.

The median income for a household in the CDP was $60,851, and the median income for a family was $66,018. Males had a median income of $47,079 versus $28,142 for females. The per capita income for the CDP was $22,550. About 5.0% of families and 6.9% of the population were below the poverty line, including 9.5% of those under age 18 and 2.9% of those age 65 or over.

Education
Residents attend school in either the Rocky Point Union Free School District or the Miller Place Union Free School District. Residents in the eastern two-thirds attend Rocky Point and the western third attends Miller Place.

Community
Sound Beach Boulevard, Echo Avenue, New York Avenue, and Lower Rocky Point Road are the main thoroughfares. The heart of this small beach hamlets downtown district is known as "The Square", and can be found where Sound Beach Boulevard and New York Avenue meet. Local staples such as George's Kitchen (now the Sound Beach Diner), La Famiglia Pizzeria, The Sunny Deli, William Schwamb Plumbing and Heating, and Matt's One Stop Auto Shop surround the square. Other nearby businesses include the Hartlin Inn, the Great Wall Chinese Restaurant, and Jimmy's Pub (now Danielle's Florist), formerly known as the Sound Beach Inn, North Country Wines & Spirits and TJ McBrews. The local volunteer fire department sits near the square on Sound Beach Boulevard. Sound Beach Property Owners' Association Private family-friendly beach access, parklands and clubhouse within walking distance.

Beaches
The beaches along the coast of Long Island Sound are constantly endangered by harsh winter storms. Many of the stairs leading down from the bluffs to the shore have had to be rebuilt several times. The Sound Beach Property Owners' Association (SBPOA) offers these to residents of the town for access to the beaches. Passes are required year round, membership is $300 per year as of 2019. The terrain of the beaches is sandy on and near the cliffs and gradually becomes rockier along the immediate shoreline. Many small fish and other small aquatic animals live in the waters of the area.

References

External links
Sound Beach Property Owners' Association
Sound Beach Fire Department
Sound Beach Civic Association

Brookhaven, New York
Long Island Sound
Hamlets in New York (state)
Census-designated places in New York (state)
Populated coastal places in New York (state)